There's Something in the Water is a 2019 Canadian documentary film, directed by Elliot Page and Ian Daniel. An examination of environmental racism, the film explores the disproportionate effect of environmental damage on Black Canadian and First Nations communities in Nova Scotia. The film takes its name from Ingrid Waldron's book on environmental racism, There's Something in the Water.

Synopsis 
The film begins by depicting conditions in the black community outside of Shelburne, Nova Scotia, where a correlation between contaminated well water and elevated rates of cancer went unaddressed. The film also explores Indigenous communities in Nova Scotia such as Pictou Landing First Nation which was affected by water pollution in Boat Harbour and Sipekneꞌkatik First Nation which is fighting against a gas company's plan to release salt brine into the Shubenacadie River.

Production 
The film was co-directed and produced by Elliot Page and Ian Daniel, who had previously worked together on the documentary series Gaycation. Starting in April 2019, it was shot on location in Nova Scotia and includes interviews with various environmental activists from marginalized communities, along with archival news footage. Page made the film with $350,000 of his own money.

Release 
The film premiered at the 2019 Toronto International Film Festival and was released on Netflix on March 27, 2020.

Reception
According to Metacritic, which sampled six critics and calculated a weighted average score of 62 out of 100, the film received "generally favorable reviews".

Jordan Mintzer of The Hollywood Reporter gave a mostly positive review, concluding that "Made in a standard documentary format that includes a voiceover and a tad too much weepy music, Water gets its job done directly enough, underlining a situation that remains dire despite what seems to be a growing level awareness around the country."

Notes

References

External links

2019 films
Canadian documentary films
Documentary films about racism in Canada
Documentary films about environmental issues
2019 documentary films
2010s English-language films
2010s Canadian films